Couple-ish is a Canadian LGBTQ+ web series created by K Alexander, who stars alongside Mercedes Morris and Sharon Belle. The series revolves around Dee Warson, a non-binary artist, who is looking for a new roommate with the help of their sister, Amy Warson. Soon they are entangled in a government conspiracy so that their new roommate, Rachel Mannt, isn't forced to leave the country. The first episode aired December 9, 2015 with new episodes posted twice a week. Season one is made up of 22 episodes and the season finale was posted on March 9, 2016. Season two, consisting of 22 episodes, premiered on April 29, 2017 and concluded on September 17, 2017.

Background and development 
The series was made possible by the support of nearly 800 backers through the series Kickstarter campaign. An Indiegogo campaign was launched in November 2016 to fundraise a second season, with a fixed goal of $45,000 USD, which was successfully raised in under a month.

Plot 
The series begins with Dee Warson stressing out over their apartment which they cannot afford to pay rent for alone, having just lost the person who was helping with bills. Their sister, Amy Warson, suggests they get a roommate and after a little convincing, they interview several candidates. One being Rachel Mannt, an English woman who moved to Canada to attend university, who seems to meet the criteria they're looking for.

Eight months later, it comes to light that Rachel's visa will expire soon and in a desperate attempt to remain in the country, she has told the Canadian government that she and Dee are in a common law partnership. The series follows the two hosting a web show that flaunts their relationship so that when investigated, their relationship seems legitimate.

Awards and nominations 
In 2016, the series was nominated for a Streamy award, ultimately losing to Brooklyn Sound.

Cast and characters

Main
 K Alexander as Dee Warson, a non-binary artist.
 Mercedes Morris as Amy Warson, Dee's sister.
 Sharon Belle as Rachel Mannt, Dee's roommate from London and internet girlfriend.
 Nicholas Potter as Edmond, Dee's boyfriend in season 1.
 Premika Leo as Cal, Dee's love interest in season 2

Supporting Characters
Diana Chrisman as Jamie, Rachel's co-worker.
Tanya Filipopoulos as Lauren.
Jaime Lujan as Cherie, Amy's friend-with-benefits.
Stacey Iseman as Rita Warson, Dee and Amy's mother.
Peter Mazzucco as Peter Warson, Dee and Amy's father..

References

See also
 List of Couple-ish episodes

2015 web series debuts
Canadian LGBT-related web series